Ogden is a town in Monroe County, New York, United States. The population was 19,856 at the 2010 census.

The Erie Canal passes through the Town of Ogden.

Geography

Ogden is bordered on the north by the town of Parma, on the east by the town of Gates, on the west by the town of Sweden, and the south by the towns of Riga and Chili.

Demographics

As of the census of 2000, there were 18,492 people, 6,527 households, and 5,032 families residing in the town.  The population density was 505.9 people per square mile (195.3/km2).  There were 6,740 housing units at an average density of 184.4 per square mile (71.2/km2).  The racial makeup of the town was 96.53% White, 1.35% African American, 0.21% Native American, 0.74% Asian, 0.03% Pacific Islander, 0.29% from other races, and 0.86% from two or more races. Hispanic or Latino of any race were 1.37% of the population.

There were 6,527 households, out of which 39.9% had children under the age of 18 living with them, 64.9% were married couples living together, 9.2% had a female householder with no husband present, and 22.9% were non-families. 18.4% of all households were made up of individuals, and 5.5% had someone living alone who was 65 years of age or older.  The average household size was 2.78 and the average family size was 3.19.

In the town, the population was spread out, with 27.8% under the age of 18, 8.7% from 18 to 24, 30.2% from 25 to 44, 24.5% from 45 to 64, and 8.9% who were 65 years of age or older.  The median age was 36 years. For every 100 females, there were 96.2 males.  For every 100 females age 18 and over, there were 92.3 males.

The median income for a household in the town was $59,240, and the median income for a family was $64,606. Males had a median income of $46,145 versus $30,438 for females. The per capita income for the town was $23,587.  About 2.0% of families and 2.7% of the population were below the poverty line, including 2.3% of those under age 18 and 2.6% of those age 65 or over.

History

The Town of Ogden was founded on January 17, 1817 from the town of Parma, at which time it was still part of Genesee County.

Government

The town is governed by a Town Board consisting of a Town Supervisor and four Board members, all elected by registered town voters.

Communities and locations in Ogden 
Adams Basin – The unincorporated hamlet of Adams Basin is within the town.
Spencerport – The Village of Spencerport is within the town.

References

External links

Rochester metropolitan area, New York
Towns in Monroe County, New York
1817 establishments in New York (state)
Populated places established in 1817